Savivesi is a medium-sized lake in the Vuoksi main catchment area. It is located in Leppävirta municipality, in the Northern Savonia region, in Finland. Savivesi's elevation is almost the same as the lake Unnukka´s elevation, and it is possible to see them as one lake.

See also
List of lakes in Finland

References

Lakes of Leppävirta